India competed in the 2017 Asian Winter Games in Sapporo and Obihiro, Japan from February 19 to 26.

India competed in two sports (six disciplines). The Indian team consists of 27 athletes (16 men and 11 women).

Competitors
The following table lists the Indian delegation per sport and gender.

Alpine skiing

India's alpine skiing team consists of nine athletes (four men and five women).

Men

Women

Cross-country skiing

India's cross-country team consists of five athletes (three men and two women).

Men

Women

Figure skating

India's figure skating team consisted of three athletes (two male and one female). For the first time, India took part in the ice dancing competition. The ice dancing pair had only practiced for 8 days before competing, which resulted in them finishing well back of the other teams.

Short track speed skating

India entered a team of six athletes in short track speed skating (5 men and 1 woman).

Men

Women

Snowboarding

India's snowboarding team consists of one male athlete.

Speed skating

Men

Women

References

Nations at the 2017 Asian Winter Games
Asian Winter Games
India at the Asian Winter Games